Tye Smith (born May 3, 1993) is an American football cornerback for the Orlando Guardians of the XFL. He played college football at Towson University and was drafted by the Seattle Seahawks in the fifth round of the 2015 NFL Draft. He has also played for the Washington Redskins and Tennessee Titans.

Early years
Smith attended Wakefield high school in Raleigh, North Carolina where he graduated in 2011.

College career
Smith committed to Towson University where he enrolled in July 2011. He attended Towson from 2011 to 2014 and played all four years.

Professional career

Seattle Seahawks
Smith was drafted by the Seattle Seahawks in the fifth round, 170th overall, of the 2015 NFL Draft.

On September 3, 2016, he was released by the Seahawks as part of final roster cuts. On September 8, 2016, he was signed to the Seahawks' practice squad. He was released on September 21, 2016.

Washington Redskins
On September 27, 2016, Smith was signed to the Washington Redskins' practice squad.

Tennessee Titans

On January 16, 2017, Smith signed a futures contract with the Tennessee Titans. In 2017, Smith played in a career-high 15 games in his first season with the Titans and posted career-bests with 11 tackles, an interception and eight special teams stops. He was placed on injured reserve on July 31, 2018.

Smith re-signed with the Titans on March 13, 2019. He was waived on November 2, 2019. Smith was re-signed on November 5, 2019 after a wrist injury to Malcolm Butler. In week 13 against the Indianapolis Colts, Smith recovered a field goal attempt by Adam Vinatieri that was blocked by teammate Dane Cruikshank and returned it for a 63 yard touchdown in the 31–17 win. In week 14 against the Oakland Raiders, Smith forced a fumble on tight end Darren Waller which was recovered by teammate Jayon Brown who returned the ball for a 46 yard touchdown during the 42–21 win.

Smith re-signed to a one-year deal with the Titans on April 21, 2020. He was released on September 5, 2020 and signed to the practice squad the next day. He was promoted to the active roster on September 14, 2020. He was placed on injured reserve on November 7, 2020. He was activated on November 28, 2020.

Minnesota Vikings
On June 3, 2021, Smith signed a contract with the Minnesota Vikings. He was released on August 31, 2021 and re-signed to the practice squad the next day.

On March 28, 2022, Smith re-signed with the Vikings. He was released on August 16, 2022, but re-signed nine days later. He was released on August 29.

Orlando Guardians
Smith signed with the Orlando Guardians of the XFL on March 6, 2023.

References

External links
 Seattle Seahawks bio 
 Tennessee Titans bio
 Towson Tigers bio

1993 births
Living people
American football cornerbacks
Minnesota Vikings players
Orlando Guardians players
Players of American football from Raleigh, North Carolina
Seattle Seahawks players
Tennessee Titans players
Towson Tigers football players
Washington Redskins players